Marukawichthys is a small genus of marine ray-finned fishes belonging to the family Rhamphocottidae, the grunt sculpins and deepwater bullhead sculpins. These fishies are found in the northwestern Pacific Ocean near Japan.

Species
There are currently two recognized species in this genus:
 Marukawichthys ambulator Ki. Sakamoto, 1931
 Marukawichthys pacificus Yabe, 1983

References

Rhamphocottidae